The Winchendon School is an elite,  coeducational, preparatory boarding and day school composed of two campuses; one in Massachusetts, and another in Herald Square, Manhattan, New York. Founded in 1926, The Winchendon School has an average classroom size of eight students, an enrollment of approximately 290 students, and a student to teacher ratio of 6:1

Campuses 
The Winchendon School is a boarding school composed of two campuses; a main campus located in Winchendon, Massachusetts, and a newly opened campus in Manhattan, New York City. The School's flagship campus in Winchendon, MA serves boarding and day students in grades 9-12 and PGs.

The NYC satellite campus is in Manhattan. The NYC campus is also closely connected with local neighborhoods through its partnership with the CDSC (Child Development Support Corporation).

MA Campus 

The MA campus includes six academic and lab buildings, six dorms, a theater, a two-story arts studio, and a music room. Its athletic facilities feature the Ritchie Ice Arena, the LaBelle Athletic Fields, Boomhower Field, six tennis courts, and two basketball and volleyball courts and a fitness center.

NYC Campus 
Winchendon's NYC campus is purposefully located in Herald Square of Manhattan.

Students 
A typical student body represents over 15 countries and approximately 15 US states. The school community includes students in 9th grade to students in 12th grade, as well as post-graduates (PGs). The Winchendon School offers a total of $3 million in needs-based grants to its students every year.

Special academic programs 
The School is recognized for three academic programs: Global Dynamics, Service Learning, and ColLABS,.

Global Dynamics is a four-year sequence of courses that provides students with an integrated, multicultural survey of different regions of the world: Asia, the Middle East, Europe, Latin America, Africa, and the United States. Students examine history, art, literature, political science, economics and sociology.

Service Learning is a year-long, student-led, project-based curriculum in which students identify a problem or issue in the community around them and then work to fix it in collaborative groups.

ColLABs, or collaborative laboratories, are open to all Winchendon students. Twice a year, Winchendon students engage in two week intensive courses, collaborative projects, and internships. These courses are elective-style workshops based on one of three types of learning experiences:
 Faculty-led, immersive classes with extensive project and field-based learning
 Student-designed (with teachers as mentors) independent projects in areas of specific interest
 Internships

Regular classes are set aside for the last two weeks of each semester so that students can pursue ColLABs of their choosing.

Winchendon's athletic teams are known as the Wapitis, and their colors are dark green and white. The following competitive sports are offered at The Winchendon School:

 Ice Hockey (boys and girls)
 Basketball (boys and girls)
 Soccer (boys and girls)
 Cross Country (boys and girls)
 Badminton (boys and girls)
 Tennis (boys and girls)
 Baseball (boys)
 Softball (girls)
 Ultimate Frisbee (boys and girls)
 Volleyball (girls)
 Golf (boys and girls)
 Lacrosse (boys and girls)

Winchendon is a part of New England Preparatory School Athletic Council (NEPSAC).

History

Williams College alumnus Robert Marr had experience at Deerfield Academy, and earlier at Vermont Academy. As new headmaster in Newport at The Hatch School in 1959, Marr maintained its tutorial model while introducing his own leadership brand. Finding a new campus emerged as a focus for the new Head. Marr settled on Winchendon's current location. The school moved in the summer 1961 to Winchendon, Massachusetts.

During the early to mid-1980s, the school faced financial difficulties, which drew attention to the failures of the school. This led to many donations to The Winchendon School. In the late 1980s, a rolling capital campaign was started that led to the addition of new dorms, a gymnasium and additional classrooms. Much of this attention happened during Headmaster LaBelle's tenure; the school has been financially healthy since.

The Winchendon School has had six headmasters. Marr's tenure (1959–1973), was followed by Lewis V. Posich, Stephen V.A. Samborski, J. William LaBelle, John A. Kerney, and current Head of School Laurie Lambert.

Notable alumni
 Justin Dentmon, professional basketball player, 2010 top scorer in the Israel Basketball Premier League
 Francisco Garcia, professional basketball player
 Malcolm Grant, professional basketball player
 Jordan Henriquez, professional basketball player
 Anthony Ireland, professional basketball player
 Jermaine Johnson, former professional basketball player and current political advisor
 Adam Kemp, professional basketball player
 Victor Page, professional basketball player
 Devon Saddler, professional basketball player
 Greg Selkoe, entrepreneur
 Marshall Strickland, professional basketball player
 Bruno Šundov, professional basketball player
 Michael Hardman, professional hockey player, Chicago Blackhawks

References

External links
 

The Winchendon School
Private high schools in Massachusetts
1926 establishments in Massachusetts
Educational institutions established in 1926